Timofey Lukashevich (born 21 March 1997) is a Belarusian professional footballer who plays for Rogachev.

References

External links 
 
 

1994 births
Living people
Belarusian footballers
Association football midfielders
FC Dinamo Minsk players
FC Luch Minsk (2012) players
FC Dnyapro Mogilev players
FC Granit Mikashevichi players
FC Dnepr Rogachev players